Carlos Mazo (born 10 March 1957) is a Colombian sports shooter. He competed in the mixed skeet event at the 1984 Summer Olympics.

References

1957 births
Living people
Colombian male sport shooters
Olympic shooters of Colombia
Shooters at the 1984 Summer Olympics
Place of birth missing (living people)